Ellis Lynley Child (23 December 1925 – 8 May 2005) was a New Zealand cricketer who played first-class cricket for Auckland and Northern Districts in the 1950s. He was also a leading player for Northland in the Hawke Cup from 1951 to 1961. He was born at Whangarei and died at Auckland.

He was the father of Neville Child, Murray Child, Roger Child and Graham Child, all of whom played at various levels for Northland. Murray also played for  Northern Districts. Graham was also an accomplished hockey player, representing Auckland and New Zealand. The family has been prominent in sheepdog trials in New Zealand for more than 50 years. Ellis was President of the New Zealand Sheep Dog Trial Association.

See also
 List of Auckland representative cricketers

References

External links 
 Profile at Cricinfo
 Profile at CricketArchive

1925 births
2005 deaths
New Zealand cricketers
Auckland cricketers
Northern Districts cricketers
Cricketers from Whangārei